Jose Isidro "Lito" Navato Camacho is a Filipino banker who served as the Philippines' Secretary of Energy and later on as Finance under President Gloria Macapagal Arroyo.

After his short stint in the government, he returned to the private sector, and now serves as Vice-Chairman of Credit Suisse of Asia–Pacific and  its Singapore Country Chief Executive Officer; Non-Executive Chairman of Sun Life of Canada (Philippines); director of SymAsia Foundation (Singapore), and member of the board of National Gallery Singapore. He is also a member of the Group of Experts of the ASEAN Capital Markets Forum, Singapore's Securities Industry Council, and the International Advisory Panel of the Securities Commission of Malaysia.

Personal life 
Camacho was born in Balanga, Bataan to Teodoro Camacho, Jr. and Leonarda Navato. His grandfather, Teodoro Camacho, Sr. was congressman and governor of Bataan.

He finished high school Don Bosco Technical Institute in Mandaluyong in 1972, and in 1975 he graduated cum laude with an A.B. Mathematics degree from De La Salle University in Manila. He studied and obtained an MBA with a concentration on Finance from Harvard Graduate School of Business Administration in the United States in 1979.

Professional career 
After college, Camacho worked at Banco Filipino, before he left to pursue graduate studies in the United States. Upon his return to the Philippines, he went back to the banking industry, and in 1995 became Senior Managing Director and Country Head of Bankers Trust New York. Later on, he became Managing Director and Chief Country Officer of Deutsche Bank in the Philippines. From 1999 to 2000, he was Managing Director and chief of Country Coverage for Investment Banking for the Asian Region of Deutsche Bank based in Singapore.

Government service 
Camacho was appointed Energy Secretary by Philippine President Gloria Macapagal Arroyo when she took office in 2001. During his tenure, much needed reforms in the country's power sector were passed into law.

On his third month as Energy Secretary, he was reassigned by Macapagal-Arroyo as Secretary of Finance, a post he held until November 2003 when he returned to the private sector. Upon his resignation as Secretary, news of the President's inaction on Camacho's recommendations for the Government Service Insurance System was perceived to have prompted it. His resignation brought anxieties and uncertainties in the government and caused the peso to plummet against the dollar to a record low. Camacho was recognized for his significant contributions in managing and stabilizing the country's fiscal deficit, and was even acknowledged by several groups of businessmen and investors as one of the best Finance secretaries the Philippines has ever had. The country's Anti-Money Laundering Law (R.A. 9160) was also passed under his tenure.

References

|-

Filipino bankers
Living people
Secretaries of Finance of the Philippines
Secretaries of Energy of the Philippines
Credit Suisse people
1955 births
Arroyo administration cabinet members
De La Salle University alumni
Harvard Business School alumni